Henry John Hyde (April 18, 1924 – November 29, 2007) was an American politician who served as a Republican member of the United States House of Representatives from 1975 to 2007, representing the 6th District of Illinois, an area of Chicago's northwestern suburbs. He was Chairman of the Judiciary Committee from 1995 to 2001, and the House International Relations Committee from 2001 to 2007. He is most famous for writing the Hyde Amendment, as a vocal opponent of abortion.

Early life

Hyde was born in Chicago, the son of Monica (Kelly) and Henry Clay Hyde. His father was English and his mother was Irish Catholic. His family supported the Democratic Party. Hyde graduated from St. George High School in 1942. He attended Duke University, where he joined the Sigma Chi Fraternity, graduated from Georgetown University and obtained his J.D. degree from Loyola University Chicago School of Law. Hyde played basketball for the Georgetown Hoyas where he helped take the team to the 1943 championship game. He served in the Navy during World War II. He remained in the Naval Reserve from 1946 to 1968, as an officer in charge of the U.S. Naval Intelligence Reserve Unit in Chicago. He retired at the rank of Commander. In 1955, Hyde joined the Knights of Columbus, and was a member of Father McDonald Council 1911 in Elmhurst, Illinois.

He was married to Jeanne Simpson Hyde from 1947 until her death in 1992; he had four children and four grandchildren.

Political career
Hyde's political views began drifting rightward after his collegiate years. By 1952, he had become a Republican and supported Dwight Eisenhower for president. He made his first run for Congress in 1962, losing to Democratic incumbent Roman Pucinski in the 11th District.

Hyde was elected to the Illinois House of Representatives in 1967 and served as Majority Leader from 1971 to 1972. He served in the Illinois House until 1974, when he was elected to the U.S. House of Representatives in November, 1974 as one of the few bright spots in what was a disastrous year for Republicans in the wake of the Watergate scandal. He faced a bruising contest against former Cook County state's attorney Edward Hanrahan, but was elected by 8,000 votes.

Political positions and legislation
Hyde was one of the most vocal and persistent opponents of abortion in American politics and was the chief sponsor of the eponymous Hyde Amendment to the House Appropriations bill that prohibited use of federal funds to pay for elective abortions through Medicaid. In 1981, however, he and U.S. Senator Jake Garn of Utah, another abortion opponent, broke with the National Pro-Life Political Action Committee, when its executive director, Peter Gemma, issued a "hit list" to target members of both houses of Congress who supported abortion rights. Hyde said such lists are counterproductive because they create irrevocable discord among legislators, any of whom can be subject to a "single issue" attack of this kind. Gemma said he was surprised by the withdrawal of Garn and Hyde from the PAC committee but continued with plans to spend $650,000 for the 1982 elections on behalf of anti-abortion candidates. In 1993 the 1976 Hyde Amendment law was amended to allow payments for abortions in case of rape, incest, or to save the life of the mother.

An original sponsor of the Brady Bill requiring background checks for gun buyers, Hyde broke with his party in 1994 when he supported a ban on the sale of semi-automatic firearms. An original sponsor of family leave legislation, Hyde said the law promoted "capitalism with a human face."

He was also involved in debates over U.S.-Soviet relations, Central America policy, the War Powers Act, NATO expansion and the investigation of the Iran-Contra affair, and sponsored the United Nations Reform Act of 2005, a bill that ties payment of U.S. dues for United Nations operations to reform of the institution's management.

House committees
Hyde was a member of the House Judiciary Committee for his entire tenure in the House. He was its Chairman from 1995 until 2001, during which time he served as the lead manager during the President Clinton impeachment trial.

From 1985 until 1991, Hyde was the ranking Republican on the House Select Committee on Intelligence. Hyde and the Committee's senior Democrat, U.S. Rep. Tom Lantos (D-CA), authored America's worldwide response to the HIV/AIDS crisis in 2003 and landmark foreign assistance legislation creating the Millennium Challenge Corporation and expanding U.S. funding for successful microenterprise initiatives.

Savings and Loan scandal

In 1981, after leaving the House Banking Committee, Hyde went on the board of directors of Clyde Federal Savings and Loan, whose Chairman was one of Hyde's political contributors. According to Salon.com, from 1982 until he left the board in 1984, Hyde used his position on the board of directors to promote the savings and loan's investment in risky financial options. In 1990, the federal government put Clyde in receivership, and paid $67 million to cover insured deposits. In 1993, the Resolution Trust Corporation sued Hyde and other directors for $17.2 million. Four years later, before pretrial investigation and depositions, the government settled with the defendants for $850,000 and made an arrangement exempting Hyde from paying anything. According to Salon.com, Hyde was the only member of the congress sued for "gross negligence" in an S&L failure.

Iran–Contra investigation

As a member of the congressional panel investigating the Iran-Contra affair, Hyde vigorously defended the Ronald Reagan administration, and a number of the participants who had been accused of various crimes, particularly Oliver North. Quoting Thomas Jefferson, Hyde argued that although various individuals had lied in testimony before Congress, their actions were excusable because they were in support of the goal of fighting communism.

Clinton impeachment

Hyde argued that the House had a constitutional and civic duty to impeach Bill Clinton for perjury. In the Resolution on Impeachment of the President, Hyde wrote:

Clinton was impeached by the House on two charges: perjury and obstruction of justice. Hyde served as chief House manager (prosecutor) at the President's trial in the Senate; he became known for his remarks in his closing argument:

Despite Hyde's efforts, President Clinton was acquitted of both perjury and obstruction of justice. With a two-thirds majority required for conviction, only 45 senators voted for conviction on the perjury charge and only 50 on the obstruction of justice charge.

Extramarital affair
While Hyde was spearheading the impeachment of President Bill Clinton amid the revelations of the Clinton–Lewinsky affair, it was revealed that Hyde himself had conducted an extramarital sexual affair with Cherie Snodgrass, who was also married. Hyde admitted to the affair and attributed the relationship as a "youthful indiscretion". He was 41 years old and married when the affair occurred. Hyde said the affair ended when Snodgrass' husband confronted Mrs. Hyde. At the time, Snodgrass was also married and had three children.

The Snodgrasses divorced in 1967. The Hydes reconciled and remained married until Mrs. Hyde's death in 1992.

9/11 and the Iraq War

As Chairman of the Foreign Relations Committee, Hyde was involved in some of the highest level debates concerning the response to the September 11 attacks in 2001. In the aftermath of the September 11, 2001 attacks, Hyde cautioned against attacking Iraq in the absence of clear evidence of Iraqi complicity, telling CNN's Robert Novak that it "would be a big mistake." One year later, however, he voted in support of the October 10, 2002 House resolution that authorized the president to go to war with Iraq. In response to Rep. Ron Paul's resolution requesting a formal declaration of war, Hyde stated: "There are things in the Constitution that have been overtaken by events, by time. Declaration of war is one of them. ... Inappropriate, anachronistic, it isn't done anymore."

In 2006, Hyde made the following observation in regard to the Bush Administration's proclaimed objective of promoting democracy in the Middle East:

Retirement
Hyde was reelected 15 times with no substantive opposition. This was mainly because, over time, his district was pushed further into DuPage County, a longstanding bastion of suburban Republicanism. However, by the turn of the century, the demographics of his district shifted, leading his 2004 Democratic challenger Christine Cegelis to garner over 44% of the vote—Hyde's closest race since his initial run for the seat. On April 18, 2005 (his 81st birthday), Hyde announced on his website that he would retire at the expiration of his term (in January 2007). A few days earlier, it had been reported that Illinois Republicans were expecting this announcement, and it was further reported that Illinois State Senator Peter Roskam had emerged as a leading contender for the Republican Party's nomination. In August 2005, Hyde endorsed Roskam as his successor.

Order of St. Gregory
Hyde was named a Papal Knight of the Order of St. Gregory the Great by Pope Benedict XVI in 2006, in recognition of his longtime support for political issues important to the Roman Catholic Church.

Presidential Medal of Freedom
Hyde received the Presidential Medal of Freedom, the nation's highest civilian honor, on November 5, 2007, awarded by President Bush. Hyde was hospitalized, recovering from open-heart surgery, and could not attend the ceremony in person.

Death
Hyde died November 29, 2007 at Rush University Medical Center in Chicago following complications from open heart surgery at Provena Mercy Medical Center in Aurora, Illinois several months earlier. His funeral Mass was presided by Cardinal Francis George of Chicago, and was attended by several dignitaries, including then Speaker of the House, Nancy Pelosi, and future Speaker of the House, John Boehner at St. John Neumann Catholic Church in Saint Charles, Illinois, where Catholic advocate Joe Weyers was employed at the time.

See also
 Hyde Amendment regarding federal payment for abortions
 Hyde Amendment (1997)
List of federal political sex scandals in the United States

References

External links
 
 USC Center on Public Diplomacy Profile
 
 Letter to the FDIC concerning Hyde and the failed Clyde Federal Savings and Loan 
 Memorial Addresses and Other Tributes Held in the House of Representatives and Senate of the United States Together with a Memorial Service in Honor of Henry J. Hyde, Late a Representative from Illinois: One Hundred Tenth Congress, First Session

  

|-
  

|-

|-

|-

|-

|-

1924 births
2007 deaths
20th-century American politicians
21st-century American politicians
American men's basketball players
United States Navy personnel of World War II
American people of English descent
American people of Irish descent
Catholics from Illinois
Duke University alumni
Georgetown Hoyas men's basketball players
Illinois lawyers
Loyola University Chicago School of Law alumni
Republican Party members of the Illinois House of Representatives
People from Elmhurst, Illinois
People from Wood Dale, Illinois
Politicians from Chicago
Presidential Medal of Freedom recipients
Republican Party members of the United States House of Representatives from Illinois
United States Navy officers
20th-century American lawyers
American anti-abortion activists
United States Navy reservists
Military personnel from Chicago